Ross Donoghue (born July 19, 1959) is a former middle-distance runner who specialized in the 1500 meters and the mile. He first rose to prominence as a standout high school runner with Bishop Cunningham High School from Oswego, New York. He was recruited by Villanova, where he would establish himself as one of the most prolific 1500-meter and mile-specialists in the school's history. Donoghue represented the United States at the 1983 Pan American Games, where he finished second overall in the men's 1500 meters. Over the course of his competitive career, he ran under four minutes in the mile on eight occasions.

Running career

High school
Donoghue attended Bishop Cunningham High School up to his graduation in the class of 1977. On November 20, 1976, he ran his last cross country race as a high schooler at the New York State Federation meet, where he placed first out of 550 runners on a 3-mile course, recording a time of 15:06.

Collegiate
Donoghue was recruited by Villanova University, a school with an emphasis on their track program. During his spell at Villanova, Donoghue was the men's 1500 meter Big East (both indoor and outdoor) champion in 1982. Although he specialized in the 1500 and the mile, he also had experience in the shorter distances, and recorded a personal best of 1:48.0 in the 800 meters while at Villanova.

Post-collegiate
Donoghue continued to train for the 1500 meters and the mile after college, and was called up to the US track team for the 1983 Pan American Games. There he finished second in the 1500 meters ahead of countryman Chuck Aragon, but was edged out by Brazilian champion Agberto Guimarães. He ran at the 1984 US Olympic Trials in the men's 1500 meters, won his preliminary heat, and subsequently pulled out of the finals in the trials due to a pain in the heel.

References

American male middle-distance runners
Villanova Wildcats men's track and field athletes
1959 births
Living people
Pan American Games silver medalists for the United States
Pan American Games medalists in athletics (track and field)
Athletes (track and field) at the 1983 Pan American Games
Medalists at the 1983 Pan American Games